A Back-to-back loan is a loan agreement between entities in two countries in which the currencies remain separate but the maturity dates remain fixed. The gross interest rates of the loan are separate as well and are set on the basis of the commercial rates in place when the agreement is signed.

Most back-to-back loans come due within 10 years, due to their inherent risks. Initiated as a way of avoiding currency regulations, the practice had, by the mid-1990s, largely been replaced by currency swaps.

One disadvantage of such agreements is asymmetrical liability - absent a specific agreement, when one party defaults on the loan, the other party may still be held responsible for repayment. Another disadvantage in comparison with currency swaps is that back-to-back loan transactions are customarily recorded on banking institutions' records as liabilities and thereby increase their capitalization requirements, while currency swaps were, during the 2000s, widely exempted from this requirement.

See also
 Parallel loan

References

International finance
Loans